Albert Valley is a hanging valley between Conway Peak and Wendler Spur in the central Apocalypse Peaks of Victoria Land. The valley opens north to Barwick Valley. Named in 2005 by the Advisory Committee on Antarctic Names after Mary R. Albert, Cold Regions Research and Engineering Laboratory, Hanover, NH, who conducted field and laboratory research to characterize ice core, firn, and snow properties from Siple Dome, from the US-ITASE traverses of West Antarctica, and from East Antarctic megadunes, 1996–2003; Member, 2002- , Polar Research Board, National Academy of Sciences; Chair 2003- , U.S. National Committee for the International Polar Year, 2007–08.

References

Valleys of Victoria Land